Homoeosaurus is an extinct genus of sphenodont reptile. It was found in limestone in Bavaria, Germany, as well as in France and the United Kingdom. It was related to the modern tuatara, though it was a considerably more gracile. There were several species varying greatly in size and morphology.

References

Jurassic lepidosaurs
Sphenodontia
Solnhofen fauna
Late Jurassic reptiles of Europe
Prehistoric reptile genera